Naomi Shelton & the Gospel Queens are an American gospel and soul music group led by front woman Naomi Shelton. The group was formed in 1999. Two founding members were from Brooklyn, New York. They have released two albums with Daptone Records, What Have You Done, My Brother? (2009) and Cold World (2014). Both albums charted on the Billboard magazine charts, where they placed on the Gospel Albums chart.

Background

The group was founded in Brooklyn during 1999 by Naomi Shelton and Cliff Driver. They were going to release an album in the mid-2000s, however the label they signed with folded. The group got a recording contract with Daptone Records in the late-2000s. Their current members are lead vocalist, Shelton, pianist and music director, Cliff Driver, background vocalists, Bobbie Jean Gant, Judy Bennett-Gibbs and Edna Johnson, guitarist, Gabriel Caplan, bassist, Fred Thomas, and drummer, Michael Post.

Music history

Their first studio album, What Have You Done, My Brother?, was released on May 26, 2009, from Daptone Records. This album was their breakthrough release upon the Billboard magazine charts, where it peaked at No. 41 on the Gospel Albums chart. They released, Cold World, on July 29, 2014, with Daptone Records. The album also peaked on the Top Gospel Albums chart, where it placed at No. 23.

Members
Current members
 Naomi Shelton - leading vocals
 Cliff Driver - pianist
 Bobbie Jean Gant - background vocals
 Edna Johnson - background vocals
 Judy Bennett-Gibbs- background vocals
 Gabriel Caplan - guitars
 Fred Thomas - bass
 Michael Post - drums

Discography

References

External links

1999 establishments in New York City
Musical groups established in 1999
African-American musical groups
American gospel musical groups
American soul musical groups
Daptone Records artists